Halesowen and Stourbridge was a parliamentary constituency in the West Midlands, which returned one Member of Parliament (MP)  to the House of Commons of the Parliament of the United Kingdom from February 1974 until it was abolished for the 1997 general election.

Its territory was then divided between the new constituencies of Halesowen & Rowley Regis and Stourbridge, both of which were held by Labour upon creation, until 2010 when the Conservatives won both seats back and have continued to retain them to date.

Boundaries
1974–1983: The Municipal Boroughs of Halesowen and Stourbridge.

1983–1997: The Metropolitan Borough of Dudley wards of Belle Vale and Hasbury, Halesowen North, Halesowen South, Hayley Green, Lye and Wollescote, Norton, Pedmore and Stourbridge East, and Wollaston and Stourbridge West.

Members of Parliament

Elections

Elections in the 1990s

Elections in the 1980s

Elections in the 1970s

See also
List of parliamentary constituencies in the West Midlands (county)

Notes and references

Parliamentary constituencies in the West Midlands (county) (historic)
Constituencies of the Parliament of the United Kingdom established in 1974
Constituencies of the Parliament of the United Kingdom disestablished in 1997
Dudley
Stourbridge